Phrom Phiram is a district (amphoe) in the northwestern part of Phitsanulok province, central Thailand. The district name means "the beautiful city of Brahma".

History 
In 1972 historians explored the old city area of Mueang Phrom Phiram. They found remains of the city wall, Chedi basements and Sukhothai Celadon on Phra Ruang Road from Sukhothai in Tambon Si Phirom and Dong Prakham. As that road continues eastward to Wat Bot and Nakhon Thai, the historians assumed it was the road for transportation between Sukhothai and Bang Yang.

Also King Trailokanat moved his troops passing Phrom Phiram to Phichai for the war with King Tilokaraj of Lanna.

The old location of Phrom Phiram was in Tambon Matum. It was created as Phrom Phiram District in 1895. The district office was moved to the right bank of the Nan River at Ban Yan Khat around 1950. When the government built the northern railway passing by Phrom Phiram District, the district office was then moved to Ban Krap Phuang (now named Ban Phrom Phiram), 500m from Phrom Phiram railway station. The district office was renovated in 1960. The present office was opened in 1976.

Geography 
Neighboring districts are (from the east clockwise), Wat Bot, Mueang Phitsanulok, and Bang Rakam of Phitsanulok Province; Kong Krailat, Mueang Sukhothai, Si Samrong, and Sawankhalok of Sukhothai province: and Phichai of Uttaradit province.

Phrom Phiram lies within the Nan Basin, which is part of the Chao Phraya Watershed. The important water resource is the Nan River.  The Khwae Noi River flows into the Nan within Phrom Phiram.

Administration 
The district is divided into 12 sub-districts (tambons), which are further subdivided into 119 villages (mubans). There are two townships (thesaban tambons): Phrom Phiram covers parts of tambon Phrom Phiram and Wong Khong covers parts of tambons Wong Khong and Matong. There are a further 12 tambon administrative organizations TAO).

Infrastructure

Significant settlements 
Of the numerous villages in  Phrom Phiram District, those that occupy several mubans are as follows:
 Ban Phrom Phiram
 Ban Sapan Hin
 Ban Grap Puang
 Ban Yan Kat
 Ban Huay Dang
 Ban Mathong
 Ban Khlong Khae
 Ban Na Kum
 Ban Khlong Mem
 Ban Phai Ko Nam
 Ban Wong Khong
 Ban Yan Yao
 Ban Hat Yai
 Ban Nong Khaem
 Ban Khlong Than
 Ban Wang Mai Gaen
 Ban Taluk Thiam

Radio 
 There is one radio station broadcast from Tambon Tha Chang, Siang Jaak Thahaan Reua (Sor. Thor. Ror. 8, Voice of the Navy). The frequency is 1170 AM.

Flooding 
In 2006, there were reported cases of leptospirosis among residents of Phrom Phiram, contracted due to the amount of standing water.

See also 
 Phrom Phiram murder case

References

External links 
 amphoe.com (Thai)

Phrom Phiram